Peperomia fraseri, commonly known as the flowering pepper, is a species of plant in the genus Peperomia of the family Piperaceae. Its native range covers Colombia and Peru. It has also been introduced to  Ecuador and Guatemala.

Description
Peperomia fraseri is a small shrub with upright stems carrying rounded or heart-shaped glossy green leaves with incised venation. It is rare among Peperomias, which mostly carry rather unremarkable tail-like flower spikes, in that it has more noticeable inflorescence: a reddish peduncle with subtly fragrant white bottle-brush flowers.

References

External links
 Peperomia fraseri, Plant of the Week April 13-19, 2001. University of Oklahoma.

fraseri
Flora of Colombia
Flora of Ecuador
Flora of Peru